Timber Neck Farm (formerly known as Laurel Grove) is a farm complex and national historic district in Faulkner, Charles County, Maryland, United States. The main house is a -story, L-shaped frame structure with a large double chimney.

The Timber Neck Farm was added to the National Register of Historic Places in 1979.

References

External links
, including photo dated 1980, at Maryland Historical Trust

Historic districts in Charles County, Maryland
Farms on the National Register of Historic Places in Maryland
Historic districts on the National Register of Historic Places in Maryland
National Register of Historic Places in Charles County, Maryland